Montpol is a locality located in the municipality of Lladurs, in Province of Lleida province, Catalonia, Spain. As of 2020, it has a population of 37.

Geography 
Montpol is located 108km northeast of Lleida.

References

Populated places in the Province of Lleida